Craneia or Kraneia was a village of ancient Epirus, within the territory of Ambracia, situated on a mountain of the same name.

Its site is tentatively located near the modern Sykies (Palioavli).

References

Populated places in ancient Epirus
Former populated places in Greece